Hypoxidaceae is a family of flowering plants, placed in the order Asparagales of the monocots.

The APG IV system of 2016 (unchanged from the 1998, 2003, and 2009 versions) recognizes this family. The family consists of four genera totalling some 160 species.

The members of the family are small to medium herbs, with grass-like leaves and an invisible stem, modified into a corm or a rhizome.  The flowers are born on leafless shoots, also called scapes.  The flowers are trimerous, radially symmetric.  The ovary is inferior, developing into a capsule or a berry.

Uses
Curculin is a taste modifying sweet protein that was discovered and from the fruit of a plant in this family (Curculigo latifolia). Consuming it causes water to taste sweet for a duration.

References

External links

Hypoxidaceae in L. Watson and M.J. Dallwitz (1992 onwards). The families of flowering plants: descriptions, illustrations, identification, information retrieval. Version: 27 April 2006. https://web.archive.org/web/20070103200438/http://delta-intkey.com/ 
links at CSDL, Texas

Asparagales families
Hypoxidaceae